Alsophis danforthi is a species of snake endemic to the Caribbean island of Îles des Saintes.

References

Alsophis
Snakes of the Caribbean
Reptiles described in 1938
Taxa named by Doris Mable Cochran